Killed by My Debt is a 2018 BBC Three drama based on the life of Jerome Rogers who died by suicide aged twenty having accrued debts of over £1,000, the debt was executed by Andrew Maughan of The London Borough of Camden, & Mike Marrs of Marston Holdings Ltd, stemming from two unpaid £65 traffic fines. The film was written by Tahsin Guner who worked closely with the Rogers family. Joseph Bullman was the director.

Background 

The film is based on the true story of Jerome Rogers (1995-2016). The practices of real-life organisations CitySprint couriers, Newlyn & Marston Holdings Ltd debt collection agency, and Camden Borough Council are depicted.

Cast 
 Chance Perdomo as Jerome
 Craig Parkinson as the Bailiff
 Juliet Cowan as Tracey Rogers
 Steve Toussaint as Bentley Duncan
 Calvin Demba as Nat Rogers
 Tom Walker as the Controller
 Leonie Elliott as Hollie Rogers
 Tamara Alexander as Cobra presenter
 Owen Brazendale as Honda salesman

Reception

John Dugdale, writing in The Sunday Times, gave a positive review praising Perdomo's performance but expressed reservations about the inserted videos featuring other debtors.

The Guardian called it 'a tale for our times'. Suzi Feay in the Financial Times described Perdomo's performance as 'powerfully empathetic' and the drama as being at times 'painful to view'. Concluding, 'only a traffic-warden with a heart of stone could fail to be moved.'

At the 2019 BAFTA TV Awards, Killed by My Debt won Best Single Drama and Chance Perdomo was nominated for a Best Actor award.

References

External links 
 
 Programme website

Films about suicide
2018 films
2018 drama films
BAFTA winners (films)
2018 television films